This list is a compilation of international cricketers who have scored centuries in all formats of the game.

Key

Men's international cricket 
Source:

Last updated: 1 March 2023

Women's international cricket 
Source:

Last updated: 2 November 2021

See also 

 List of cricketers by number of international centuries scored

References 

Lists of cricketers
Cricket records and statistics